Vieux-Comptoir or Old Factory was a small Cree community at the mouth of Vieux-Comptoir River off James Bay in Quebec, Canada.  The community was established as a trading post in the 17th century, but abandoned when the Cree were relocated to Wemindji, Quebec,  to the north in 1959.

References

Cree villages in Quebec
Eeyou Istchee (territory)